Chennupati (చెన్నుపాటి) is an Indian surname and may refer to:

 Chennupati Vidya, an Indian politician and social worker
 Chennupati Jagadish, a Distinguished Professor of Physics at the Australian National University Research School of Physics and Engineering

Surnames of Indian origin